The 385th Fighter Squadron is an inactive United States Air Force unit. Its last assignment was with 364th Fighter Group stationed at Camp Kilmer, New Jersey.

History
Organized and trained in California during 1943, assigned to 364th Fighter Group. Moved to England in January 1944, being assigned to VIII Fighter Command.

Initially flew escort, dive-bombing, strafing, and patrol missions in France, Belgium, the Netherlands, and Germany. At first the squadron operated primarily as escort for B-17/B-24 Liberator heavy bombers.

Patrolled the English Channel during the Normandy invasion in June 1944, and, while continuing escort operations, supported ground forces in France after the invasion by strafing and bombing locomotives, marshalling yards, bridges, barges, and other targets. Converted from P-38's to P-51 Mustang's in the summer of 1944 and from then until the end of the war flew many long-range escort missions heavy bombers that attacked oil refineries, industries, and other strategic objectives at Berlin, Regensburg, Merseburg, Stuttgart, Brussels, and elsewhere. Also flew air-sea rescue missions, engaged in patrol activities, and continued to support ground forces as the battle line moved through France and into Germany.

Demobilized in England during the summer of 1945, personnel returning to the United States. Inactivated as a paper unit, November 1945.

Lineage
 Constituted 385th Fighter Squadron on 25 May 1943
 Activated on 1 June 1943
 Inactivated on 10 November 1945

Assignments
 364th Fighter Group, 1 June 1943 – 10 November 1945.
 Assigned Fuselage Code: 5E

Stations
 Glendale Airport, California, 1 June 1943
 Van Nuys Airport,  California, 12 August 1943
 Oxnard Flight Strip, California, c. 1 October 1943
 Santa Maria Army Airfield, California, 27 December 1943 – 14 January 1944
 RAF Honington, England, 10 February 1944-c. 4 November 1945
 Camp Kilmer, New Jersey, 9–10 November 1945

Aircraft
 P-38 Lightning, 1943–1944
 P-51D Mustang, 1944–1945

References

 

Fighter squadrons of the United States Army Air Forces